Rahil Sanjay Shah (born 20 October 1985) is an Indian cricketer who plays for Tripura. He is a slow left-arm orthodox bowler.

References

External links
 

1985 births
Living people
Indian cricketers
Tamil Nadu cricketers
Cricketers from Surat